Oley Speaks (June 28, 1874 – August 7, 1948) was an American composer and songwriter.  His compositions include many religious songs, as well as his best-known success, "On the Road to Mandalay", which takes its lyrics from the poem "Mandalay" by Rudyard Kipling. The Canal Winchester Area Historical Society Museum has exhibits about the life of Oley Speaks, including original sheet music written by him.

Biography

Speaks was born in Canal Winchester, Ohio, the son of a grain merchant and contractor.  He was ten when his father Charles W. died, and his mother Sarah and family moved to Columbus soon afterwards.  He learned the piano as a boy, and was praised for his baritone voice as early as 1891 by The Columbus Dispatch.  In the 1890s he began his career as a railroad clerk at a station in Columbus, Ohio, until he decided to pursue his musical passions. He was developing a reputation as a fine baritone singer in churches in Columbus before he moved to New York City in 1898 and started taking lessons. One of his voice teachers was the American soprano Emma Thursby.  Speaks had a successful career as a singer, touring the United States giving recitals and also appearing in oratorios.

Speaks began to write songs, many with religious themes.  He studied composition with Will Macfarlane and Max Spicker. In 1907, he wrote "On the Road to Mandalay" using the words of Rudyard Kipling's poem "Mandalay", which sold over one million copies. The song was a popular parlour ballad, particularly in the United Kingdom and British territories worldwide, and was boosted by the recording by Frank Sinatra which was released on the Come Fly with Me album in 1958. However, after some resistance from the Kipling estate over the omission of several verses, this version of the song remained embargoed in the British Commonwealth until it appeared on the digitally-remastered release of the album many years later. Speaks had two further million-selling successes, "Morning" to a lyric by Frank Lebby Stanton in 1910 and "Sylvia" to a lyric by Clinton Scollard in 1914. The American baritone Robert Merrill, the Austrian tenor Richard Tauber, the Swedish tenor Jussi Bjorling and the American singer Nelson Eddy were among the singers who recorded "Sylvia". The Irish tenor John McCormack's recordings of all three famous titles are available on CD. More recently, American baritone Thomas Hampson has also recorded "On the Road to Mandalay".

Speaks was a prominent member of ASCAP, where he was elected director in 1924 and served until 1943.  He was also a National Patron of Delta Omicron, an international professional music fraternity.

In the movies
Speaks can be described as a "one-hit wonder", but his most famous work was included in the soundtrack of several films:

 Paul Tremaine and His Aristocrats (1929) (sung by Paul Tremaine)
 Metro Movietone Revue (1929/II) (sung by George Dewey Washington)
 Mandalay (1934)  (played during opening credits) (not to be confused with The Road to Mandalay, a 1926 film)
 China Seas (1935) (variation played as part of the score during the opening credits and at the end)
 Metropolitan (1935) (sung by Lawrence Tibbett with piano accompaniment by Luis Alberni (who both appeared) in the score during the end credits)
 They Met in Bombay (1941) (played several times as part of the score)
S.O.B. (1981) Robert Preston sings a few seconds of Mandalay: "And the dawn comes up like thunder..."  at 1:46

Musical works
Over 250 songs, originally published by G. Schirmer or The John Church Company, including:

Sacred Anthems, including:
 Gently, Lord, Oh, Gently Lead Us (Thomas Hastings, arr. Lucien Chaffin) (Schirmer, 1914)
 Now the Day is Over (Schirmer)

Choral Partsongs, including:
 In Maytime (Frank L. Stanton) (John Church)

Footnotes

References

External links
 Canal Winchester Area Historical Society
 Derek B Scott sings "On the Road to Mandalay" (1907)
 Oley Speaks at Naxos Records
  by Frank Lebby Stanton & Oley Speaks as sung by Eleanor Steber
  by Frank Lebby Stanton & Oley Speaks as sung by Tessa Folch
  by Frank Lebby Stanton & Oley Speaks as sung by Webster Booth
 Free Oley Speaks sheet music from the Ball State University Digital Media Repository

1874 births
1948 deaths
American baritones
American male composers
People from Canal Winchester, Ohio
Singers from Ohio
Songwriters from Ohio
20th-century American singers
20th-century American composers
20th-century American male singers
American male songwriters